Nicky Katt (born May 11, 1971) is an American actor. Katt often plays unsympathetic characters, such as an irascible motorhead in Dazed and Confused, an ill-fated white supremacist child rapist in A Time to Kill, and an embittered business rival in Boiler Room.

Career
Katt known for his role as unorthodox teacher Harry Senate on David E. Kelley's Fox drama series Boston Public. Katt's film roles include Clint Bruno in Dazed and Confused (1993), Billy Ray Cobb in A Time to Kill (1996), Tim in SubUrbia (1996), Stacy the hitman in The Limey (1999), Greg Weinstein in Boiler Room (2000), Adolf Hitler in Full Frontal (2002), Fred Duggar in Insomnia (2002), Stuka in Sin City (2005), and Nate Petite in Snow Angels (2008).

Katt has co-starred in many movies and received critical praise for performances in The Limey and SubUrbia. He was originally cast to star in the ABC spring 2006 replacement series The Evidence, but was replaced by Rob Estes. Katt was a child actor as well, appearing as Marc Singer's son on the television series V. He also lent his voice in gaming as the voice of Atton Rand in Star Wars Knights of the Old Republic II: The Sith Lords.

Filmography

Films
 2013 Behind the Candelabra as Mr. Y
 2011 The Sitter as NYPD Officer
 2008 The Dark Knight as S.W.A.T. Member
 2008 Harold as Police Officer #1
 2007 Snow Angels as Nate Petite
 2007 Planet Terror as Joe
 2007 Death Proof as Counter Guy
 2007 The Brave One as Detective Vitale
 2006 Monk Sergeant Ryan Sharkey, Jr.
 2006 World Trade Center as Volunteer Fireman
 2005 Sin City as Stuka
 2004 Riding the Bullet as Ferris
 2003 Secondhand Lions as Stan
 2003 School of Rock as "Razor"
 2002 Insomnia as Detective Fred Duggar
 2002 Full Frontal as Hitler
 2001 Waking Life as Himself
 2000 The Way of the Gun as Obecks
 2000 Boiler Room as Greg Weinstein
 1999 The Limey as Stacy, The Hitman
 1998 One True Thing as Jordan Belzer
 1998 Phantoms as Deputy Steve Shanning
 1997 Batman & Robin as "Spike"
 1996 subUrbia as Tim
 1996 A Time to Kill as Billy Ray Cobb
 1995 The Babysitter as Mark
 1995 Strange Days as Joey Corto
 1995 The Doom Generation as Carnoburger Cashier
 1995 The Cure as "Pony"
 1993 American Yakuza as Vic
 1993 Dazed and Confused as Clint Bruno
 1989 The 'Burbs as Steve Kuntz, Ricky's Friend
 1981 Underground Aces as Son

Television roles
 2018 Casual as Cyril
 2006 Monk as Sergeant Ryan Sharkey
 2003 The Guardian as Evan Piscarek
 2000-2002 Boston Public as Harry Senate
 1996 Friends as Arthur
 1996 Kindred: The Embraced as Starkweather
 1995 Double Rush as Nicky
 1990 Lifestories as Paul Albertson
 1988 The Facts of Life as Mark
 1984 V as Sean Donovan
 1983 Quincy, M.E. as Jeff Reano
 1982 Trapper John, M.D. as Scott Spencer
 1982 Voyagers! as Jack, The Artful Dodger
 1982 Herbie, the Love Bug as Matthew MacLane
 1981 Father Murphy as Chester
 1981 CHiPs as Pat McGuire
 1980 Fantasy Island as Bookie

Video games
 2004 Star Wars Knights of the Old Republic II: The Sith Lords (VG) as Atton Rand

References

External links
 

Living people
American male child actors
American male film actors
American male television actors
American male video game actors
American male voice actors
Male actors from South Dakota
20th-century American male actors
21st-century American male actors
1971 births